The 2012 Illinois judicial elections consisted of both partisan and retention elections, including those one seat of the Supreme Court of Illinois for ten seats in the Illinois Appellate Court. Primary elections were held on March 20, 2012, and general elections were held on November 6, 2012. These elections were part of the 2012 Illinois elections.

Supreme Court of Illinois
Justices of the Supreme Court of Illinois are elected by district. One seat held a partisan election, while another held a retention election.

The court has seven seats total separated into five districts. The first district, representing Cook County, contains three seats, making it a multi-member district, while other four districts are single-member districts. Justices hold ten year terms.

1st district
In October 2010, Democrat Mary Jane Theis was appointed by the Supreme Court to fill the vacancy left by the retirement of justice Thomas R. Fitzgerald. Theis successfully ran for election to fill this seat for a full term.

Democratic primary

Republican primary
No candidates ran in the primary for the Republican nomination. Republicans ultimately nominated James Gerard Riley.

General election

The court has seven seats total separated into five districts. The first district contains three seats (making it a multi-member district), while other four districts are single-member districts. Justices hold ten year terms.

Retention elections
To be retained, judges were required to have 60% of their vote be "yes".

Illinois Appellate Court
Illinois Appellate Court justices hold ten-year terms.

1st district (Cahill vacancy)
A vacancy was created by the death of Robert Cahill. Matthias William Delort was elected to fill the judgeship. This was a regular election, as Cahill's term would have ended in 2012.

Democratic primary
Candidates
 Matthias William Delort, Cook County Circuit Court judge
Mary Brigid Hayes, member of the Village of La Grange Park Police Commission
Kay Marie Hanlon, Northfield Township trustee
Pamela E. Hill-Veal, Cook County Circuit Court judge
James Michael McGing, 1992 Democratic nominee for Illinois State Senate 7th district
Laura Marie Sullivan, Cook County Circuit Court judge

Results

Republican primary
No candidates ran in the primary for the Republican nomination.

General election

1st district (Coleman vacancy)
A vacancy was created when Sharon Johnson Coleman stepped down in order to accept a position on the United States District Court for the Northern District of Illinois. Nathaniel Roosevelt Howse, Jr. was elected to fill the judgeship. Before being elected to this judgeship, Howse had already been serving on the Appellate Court, having been appointed to a different 1st district judgeship in August 2009, after the retirement of Denise M. O'Malley. This was a regular election, as Coleman's term would have ended in 2012.

Democratic primary

Republican primary
No candidates ran in the primary for the Republican nomination.

General election

1st district (Gallagher vacancy)
A vacancy was created when Michael Gallagher retired. P. Scott Neville Jr. was elected to fill the judgeship. Before being elected to this judgeship, Neville had already been serving on the Appellate Court, having been served as an appointed member of the first district since 2004.

Democratic primary
Candidates
P. Scott Neville Jr., Illinois Appellate Court judge
Marguerite Quinn, Cook County Circuit Court judge
Patrick J. Sherlock, Cook County Circuit Court judge
 
Results

Republican primary
No candidates ran in the primary for the Republican nomination.

General election

1st district (O'Brien vacancy)
A vacancy was created when Sheila O'Brien retired in 2011. Jesse G. Reyes was elected to fill the judgeship.

Democratic primary
Candidates
William Stewart Boyd, Cook County Circuit Court judge
Ellen L. Flannigan, Cook County Circuit Court judge
Rodolfo "Rudy" Garcia, Illinois Appellate Court judge
Jesse G. Reyes, Cook County Circuit Court judge
Don R. Sampen, former Illinois assistant attorney general

Results

Republican primary
No candidates ran in the primary for the Republican nomination.

General election

1st district (Theis vacancy)
A vacancy was created when Mary Jane Theis was appointed to the Illinois Supreme Court in 2010. Maureen Connors, who had been appointed in October 2010 to fill the judgeship until a permanent occupant would be elected in 2012, was elected to permanently fill the judgeship.

Democratic primary
Candidates
Maureen Connors, incumbent occupant of the judgeship

Results

Republican primary
No candidates ran in the primary for the Republican nomination.

General election

1st district (Tully vacancy)
A vacancy was created when John Tully retired on December 31, 2009. Terrance J. Lavin, who had been appointed on February 1, 2010 to fill the judgeship until a permanent occupant would be elected in 2012, was elected to permanently fill the judgeship.

Democratic primary
Candidates
Terrence J. Lavin, incumbent occupant of the judgeship

Results

Republican primary
No candidates ran in the primary for the Republican nomination.

General election

2nd district (O'Malley vacancy)
A vacancy was created when Jack O'Malley retired on December 3, 2010. Joseph Birkett, who had been appointed on fill the judgeship until a permanent occupant would be elected in 2012, was elected to permanently fill the judgeship.

Democratic primary
No candidates ran in the primary for the Democratic nomination.

Republican primary
Candidates
Joseph Birkett, incumbent occupant of the judgeship

Results

General election

4th district (Myerscough vacancy)
A vacancy was created when Sue E. Myerscough left her judgeship in the Illinois Appellate Court's 4th district to become a judge of the United States District Court for the Central District of Illinois in February 2010. Carol Pope was elected to fill the judgeship. Before being elected to this judgeship, Pope had already been serving on the Illinois Appellate Court's, having been appointed to a different 4th district judgeship in December 2008.

Democratic primary
No candidates ran in the primary for the Democratic nomination.

Republican primary
Candidates
Carol Pope, Illinois Appellate Court judge

Results

General election

5th district (Donovan vacancy)
A vacancy was created when James Donovan retired on December 2, 2012. Judy Cates was elected to fill the judgeship.

Democratic primary
Candidates
Judy Cates, attorney and former St. Clair County state's attorney

Results

Republican primary
Candidates
Stephen P. McGlynn, Illinois 20th Judicial Circuit judge and former Illinois Appellate Court judge
 
Results

General election

Retention elections
To be retained, judges were required to have 60% of their vote be "yes".

Lower courts

Lower courts also saw judicial elections.

References

Judicial
2012